The Collective Security Treaty Organization (CSTO) is an intergovernmental military alliance in Eurasia consisting of six post-Soviet states: Armenia, Belarus, Kazakhstan, Kyrgyzstan, Russia, and Tajikistan. The Collective Security Treaty has its origins in the Soviet Armed Forces, which was replaced in 1992 by the United Armed Forces of the Commonwealth of Independent States, and was then itself replaced by the successor armed forces of the respective independent states.

Similar to Article 5 of the North Atlantic Treaty and the Inter-American Treaty of Reciprocal Assistance, Article 4 of the Collective Security Treaty (CST) establishes that an aggression against one signatory would be perceived as an aggression against all. The CSTO charter reaffirmed the desire of all participating states to abstain from the use or threat of force. Signatories are prohibited from joining other military alliances.

Activities

Exercises
The CSTO holds yearly military command exercises for the CSTO nations to have an opportunity to improve inter-organization cooperation. A CSTO military exercise called "Rubezh 2008" was hosted in Armenia, where a combined total of 4,000 troops from all seven constituent CSTO member countries conducted operative, strategic and tactical training.

The largest of such exercises was held in Southern Russia and central Asia in 2011, consisting of more than 10,000 troops and 70 combat aircraft. In order to deploy military bases of a third country in the territory of the CSTO member-states, it is necessary to obtain the official consent of all its members. It also employs a "rotating presidency" system in which the country leading the CSTO alternates every year.

Scenarios of the exercises are grouped around:
 "Cooperation" command-post exercises of the collective forces of operative reaction,
 "Search" special maneuvers with the participation of intelligence forces,
 "Echelon" material and technical supply drills
 "Frontier"
 "Endurable Brotherhood"

CSTO Parliamentary Assembly 
Similar to NATO, the CSTO maintains a Parliamentary Assembly.

Peacekeeping force 
On 6 October 2007, CSTO members agreed to a major expansion of the organization that would create a CSTO peacekeeping force that could deploy under a U.N. mandate or without one in its member states. The expansion would also allow all members to purchase Russian weapons at the same price as Russia.

In January 2022, the CSTO deployed 2,000 of its peacekeepers to Kazakhstan.

Collective Rapid Reaction Force 

On 4 February 2009, an agreement to create the Collective Rapid Reaction Force (KSOR) (Russian: Коллекти́вные си́лы операти́вного реаги́рования (КСОР)) was reached by five of the seven members, with plans finalized on 14 June. The force is intended to be used to repulse military aggression, conduct anti-terrorist operations, fight transnational crime and drug trafficking, and neutralize the effects of natural disasters.

Belarus and Uzbekistan initially refrained from signing on to the agreement. Belarus did so because of a trade dispute with Russia, and Uzbekistan due to general concerns. Belarus signed the agreement the following October, while Uzbekistan has never done so. A source in the Russian delegation said Uzbekistan would not participate in the collective force on a permanent basis but would "delegate" its detachments to take part in operations on an ad hoc basis.

On 3 August 2009, the Ministry of Foreign Affairs of Uzbekistan criticized plans by Russia to establish a military base in southern Kyrgyzstan for the CSTO rapid reaction force, stating,

History

Foundation

On 15 May 1992, six post-Soviet states belonging to the Commonwealth of Independent States — Russia, Armenia, Kazakhstan, Kyrgyzstan, Tajikistan, and Uzbekistan—signed the Collective Security Treaty (also referred to as the Tashkent Pact or Tashkent Treaty). Three other post-Soviet states—Azerbaijan, Belarus, and Georgia—signed in 1993 and the treaty took effect in 1994. The CST was set to last for a 5-year period unless extended. On 2 April 1999, six of the nine—all but Azerbaijan, Georgia, and Uzbekistan—agreed to renew the treaty for five more years. At the same time, Uzbekistan joined the GUAM group, established in 1997 by Georgia, Ukraine, Azerbaijan, and Moldova, and largely seen as intending to counter Russian influence in the region. In 2002, the 6 member states agreed to create the Collective Security Treaty Organization as a military alliance.

2005 and later

During 2005, the CSTO partners conducted some common military exercises.

Uzbekistan later withdrew from GUAM in 2005 and joined the CSTO in 2006 as a full member and its membership was later ratified by the Uzbek parliament on 28 March 2008.

In June 2007, Kyrgyzstan assumed the rotating CSTO presidency.

In October 2007, the CSTO signed an agreement with the Shanghai Cooperation Organisation (SCO), in the Tajik capital of Dushanbe, to broaden cooperation on issues such as security, crime, and drug trafficking.

On 6 October 2007, CSTO members agreed to a major expansion of the organization that would create a CSTO peacekeeping force that could deploy under a U.N. mandate or without one in its member states. The expansion would also allow all members to purchase Russian weapons at the same price as Russia.

On 29 August 2008, Russia announced it would seek CSTO recognition of the independence of Abkhazia and South Ossetia. Three days earlier, on 26 August, Russia recognized the independence of Georgia's breakaway regions of Abkhazia and South Ossetia.

On 5 September 2008, Armenia assumed the rotating CSTO presidency during a CSTO meeting in Moscow, Russia.

In 2009, Belarus boycotted the CSTO summit due to their Milk War with Russia. After refusing to attend a CSTO summit in 2009, Lukashenko said: "Why should my men fight in Kazakhstan? Mothers would ask me why I sent their sons to fight so far from Belarus. For what? For a unified energy market? That is not what lives depend on. No!"

After Kurmanbek Bakiyev was ousted from office as President of Kyrgyzstan as a result of riots in Kyrgyzstan in April 2010, he was granted asylum in Belarus. Belarusian President Alexander Lukashenko expressed doubt about the future of the CSTO for failing to prevent Bakiyev's overthrow, stating: "What sort of organization is this one, if there is bloodshed in one of our member states and an anticonstitutional coup d'état takes place, and this body keeps silent?" 

Lukashenko had previously accused Russia of punishing Belarus with economic sanctions after Lukashenko's refusal to recognize the independence of Abkhazia and South Ossetia, stating: "The economy serves as the basis for our common security. But if Belarus's closest CSTO ally is trying ... to destroy this basis and de facto put the Belarusians on their knees, how can one talk about consolidating collective security in the CSTO space?"

During a trip to Ukraine to extend Russia's lease of the Crimean port Sevastopol in return for discounted natural gas supplies, Russian President Dmitry Medvedev was asked about whether Belarus could expect a similar deal and responded: "Real partnership is one thing and a declaration of intentions is another; reaching agreement on working seriously, meeting each other halfway, helping each other is one thing and making decisions about granting permanent residence to people who have lost their job is another." The Belarusian President defended himself against this criticism by citing former Russian President Vladimir Putin's invitation of Askar Akayev to Russia after he was ousted as President of Kyrgyzstan during the 2005 Tulip Revolution. 

The following month, President Medvedev ordered the CEO of Russia's natural gas monopoly Gazprom to cut gas supplies to Belarus in a dispute over outstanding debts. Subsequently, the Russian television channel NTV, run by Gazprom, aired a documentary film which compared Lukashenko to Bakiyev. Then the Russian President's foreign policy adviser Sergei Prikhodko threatened to publish the transcript of a CSTO meeting where Lukashenko said that his administration would recognize Abkhazian and South Ossetian independence.

In June 2010, ethnic clashes broke out between ethnic Kyrgyz and Uzbeks in southern Kyrgyzstan, leading interim Kyrgyz President Roza Otunbayeva to request the assistance of Russian troops to quell the disturbances. Kurmanbek Bakiyev denied charges that his supporters were behind the ethnic conflict and called on the CSTO to intervene. Askar Akayev also called for the CSTO to send troops, saying: "Our priority task right now should be to extinguish this flame of enmity. It is very likely that we will need CSTO peacekeepers to do that." The organisation was considered by some a "paper tiger" since it failed to intervene.

Russian President Dmitry Medvedev said that "only in the case of a foreign intrusion and an attempt to externally seize power can we state that there is an attack against the CSTO", and that, "all the problems of Kyrgyzstan have internal roots", while CSTO Secretary General Nikolai Bordyuzha called the violence "purely a domestic affair". Later, however, Bordyuzha admitted that the CSTO response may have been inadequate and claimed that "foreign mercenaries" provoked the Kyrgyz violence against ethnic Uzbek minorities.

On 21 July 2010, interim Kyrgyz President Roza Otunbayeva called for the introduction of CSTO police units to southern Kyrgyzstan saying: "I think it's important to introduce CSTO police forces there, since we're unable to guarantee people's rights on our own." She also added: "I'm not seeking the CSTO's embrace and I don't feel like bringing them here to stay but the bloodletting there will continue otherwise." Only weeks later the deputy chairman of Otubayeva's interim Kyrgyz government complained that their appeals for help from the CSTO had been ignored. The CSTO was unable to agree on providing military assistance to Kyrgyzstan at a meeting in Yerevan, Armenia, which was attended by Roza Otunbayeva as well as Alexander Lukashenko.

On 10 December 2010, the member states approved a declaration establishing a CSTO peacekeeping force and a declaration of the CSTO member states, in addition to signing a package of joint documents.

Since 21 December 2011, the Treaty parties can veto the establishment of new foreign military bases in the member states of the Collective Security Treaty Organization (CSTO). Additionally, Kazakhstan took over the rotating presidency of the CSTO from Belarus.

On 28 June 2012, Uzbekistan suspended its membership in the CSTO.

In August 2014, 3,000 soldiers from the members of Armenia, Belarus, Kazakhstan, Kyrgyzstan, Russia and Tajikistan participated in psychological and cyber warfare exercises in Kazakhstan under war games managed by CSTO.

On 19 March 2015, the CSTO Secretary General Nikolai Bordyuzha offered to send a peacekeeping mission to Donbas, Ukraine. "The CSTO has a peacekeeping capacity. Our peacekeepers continuously undergo corresponding training. If such a decision is taken by the United Nations, we stand ready to provide peacekeeping units".

In July 2021, CSTO Secretary-General Stanislav Zas was criticised by Armenian politicians for calling an incursion by Azerbaijani forces onto Armenian territory a "border incident", where the CSTO remained inactive during the conflict.

In July 2021, Tajikistan appealed to members of CSTO for help in dealing with security challenges emerging from neighboring Afghanistan. Thousands of Afghans, including police and government troops, fled to Tajikistan after Taliban insurgents took control of many parts of Afghanistan.

On 5 January 2022, CSTO peacekeepers were announced to be deployed to Kazakhstan in response to anti-government unrest in the country. On 11 January the same year, CSTO forces began their withdrawal from Kazakhstan.

Deterioration of unity
After the start of renewed fighting between Armenia and former member Azerbaijan on 13 September 2022, Armenia triggered Article 4 of the treaty and a CSTO mission, including CSTO Secretary General Stanislav Zas and Anatoly Sidorov was sent to monitor the situation along the border. A similar event also took place near the Kyrgyzstan–Tajikistan border throughout 2022.

After the CSTO mission took a rather uncommitted position in the conflict, criticism towards CSTO membership inside Armenian political circles increased, with the secretary of the Security Council of Armenia, Armen Grigoryan even stating that he saw no more hope for the CSTO. The lack of Russian support during the conflict prompted a national debate in Armenia, as an increasing percentage of the population put into doubt whether it is beneficial to continue CSTO membership, calling for realignment of the state with NATO instead. This coincided with a visit from Speaker of the United States House of Representatives Nancy Pelosi to Yerevan on 17 September 2022, largely seen as an effort to reorient the security alliance structure of Armenia. 

To discuss the results of the CSTO mission sent on 15 September 2022, an extraordinary session of the CSTO was held via videoconference on 28 October 2022. With the leaders of all member states and CSTO Secretary General Stanislav Zas in attendance, the meeting was chaired by the Armenian Prime Minister Nikol Pashinyan, who concurred with the report presented by the Secretary General, while also reiterating the importance for a clear political assessment of Azerbaijani aggression and a roadmap for the restoration of Armenian territorial integrity.

A regular Collective Security Council meeting took place on 23 November 2022 with leaders of all CSTO members being present to discuss matters of international and regional security. After Pashinyan refused to sign the joint declaration, because it did not "reach a decision on a CSTO response to Azerbaijan's aggression against Armenia", speculation arose regarding the continuity of the CSTO. Secretary General Stanislas Zas pointed out that numerous measures in the diplomatic as well as military spheres were generally agreed upon, but no consensual assessement of the situation on the border could be reached. On the occasion of the meeting and inmidst of the 2022 Russian invasion of Ukraine, Belarusian President Alexander Lukashenko stated that many in their countries had started to discuss that the CSTO may cease to exist, if Russia loses the war in Ukraine. He later shared his opinion on the matter, stating that the CSTO will continue on and nobody will fall, if there is unity. Meanwhile, during the meeting held in Yerevan, large groups of protestors gathered and called for the withdrawal of Armenia from the CSTO and for the country to develop closer relations with the United States and the West. In the aftermath of the meeting, the US think tank The National Interest released an analysis on the current state of the CSTO and concluded that while the alliance is in a fragile state, only few other nations could fill the void created by a possible Russian exit and step in as a power broker in the region. Economic dependencies between the member states have also increased since the start of the invasion and would dissuade the alliance from splitting up. 

The diplomatic friction continued into January 2023, after Pashinyan refused to hold common military drills, because the organisation did not unequivocally condemn Azerbaijan over its perceived aggression. In response, Dmitry Peskov stated that Armenia remains a very close ally and promised to continue the dialogue. To mend their ties, Sergey Lavrov offered the deployment of a CSTO mission along the Armenia-Azerbaijan border on 2 February 2023 within one or two days, "if our Armenian allies, friends are still interested in it like before".

Membership

Member states

Member states of the Collective Security Treaty Organization:

Former member states

Observer states in the CSTO Parliamentary Assembly

Potential membership

In May 2007, the CSTO secretary-general Nikolai Bordyuzha suggested Iran could join the CSTO saying, "The CSTO is an open organization. If Iran applies in accordance with our charter, we will consider the application". If Iran joined it would be the first state outside the former Soviet Union to become a member of the organization.

The National Assembly of the Republic of Serbia and the Wolesi Jirga (lower house) of the National Assembly of the Islamic Republic of Afghanistan were accorded observer status in the CSTO Parliamentary Assembly in 2013, though the Islamic Republic collapsed in 2021 as the Taliban took over. Also, the Parliamentary Assembly of the Union of Belarus and Russia has observer status in the CSTO Parliamentary Assembly. 

In 2021, Uzbekistan, after becoming observer to EAEU on 11 December 2020, conducted a bilateral military exercise with Russia and trilateral military exercise with Russia and Tajikistan, while its president joined a CSTO meeting as a guest, sparking rumours about potential reentry into CSTO.

List of Secretaries-General 

The following have served as heads of the CSTO:

Acting

Policy agenda

Information technology and cyber security
The member states adopted measures to counter cyber security threats and information technology crimes in a Foreign Ministers Council meeting in Minsk, Belarus. Foreign Minister Abdrakhmanov put forward a proposal to establishing a Cyber Shield system.

Military personnel
The following list is sourced from the 2020 edition of "The Military Balance" published annually by the International Institute for Strategic Studies.

See also

 Soviet Armed Forces
 Commonwealth of Independent States (CIS)
 Community for Democracy and Rights of Nations
 Eurasian Economic Community (EURASEC)
 Eurasian Economic Union (EAEU)
 GUAM Organization for Democracy and Economic Development (GUAM)
 Military alliance
 North Atlantic Treaty Organization (NATO)
 Post-Soviet states
 Shanghai Cooperation Organisation (SCO)
 Southeast Asia Treaty Organization (SEATO)
 Warsaw Pact

Notes

References

Bibliography

External links 

 CSTO Official Site 
 CSTO Official Site 
 Official Site of the Parliamentary Assembly of the CSTO 
 The Charter of the CSTO

 
Post-Soviet alliances
20th-century military alliances
21st-century military alliances
Intergovernmental organizations established by treaty
International military organizations
Military of Armenia
Military of Belarus
Military of Kazakhstan
Military of Kyrgyzstan
Military of Russia
Military of Tajikistan
Multilateral relations of Russia
Post-Soviet states
Organizations established in 1994
1994 establishments in Russia
1994 establishments in Asia
1994 establishments in Europe
United Nations General Assembly observers